Epischnia christophori is a species of snout moth in the genus Epischnia. It was described by Émile Louis Ragonot in 1887, and is known from Armenia.

References

Moths described in 1887
Phycitini
Insects of Turkey